French Marines may refer to any of the following:

Historical
 Troupes de la marine, the corps maintained by the French Navy to protect its ships
 Compagnies Franches de la Marine, the above which was renamed and retrained serve as amphibious troops and overseas garrisons
 Compagnie Ordinaire de la Mer, another corps maintained by the French Navy to protect its ships
 Régiment de La Marine, the above formed into a regiment which later became the French Army's 11th Infantry Regiment,
 The Troupes de la Marine were transferred to the French Army and renamed Troupes coloniales from 1900 - 1960 

See also: French Marines in Canada, 1683-1715

Current
 Troupes de marine,  a corps of the current French Army 
  Force maritime des fusiliers marins et commandos (FORFUSCO) has command and control over the following: 
 Fusiliers Marins, the current force in charge of providing protection for French naval vessels and facilities.
 Commandos Marine, the Special Operation Forces (SOF) of the French Navy.